Ephraim Porter Felt (January 7, 1868 – December 14, 1943) was an American entomologist who specialised in Diptera.

Biography
Ephraim Porter Felt was born in Salem, Massachusetts on January 7, 1868, to Charles Wilson Felt and Martha Seeth Ropes Felt. He was educated at Massachusetts Agricultural College, Boston University, and Cornell. From 1893 to 1895, Felt taught natural sciences at Clinton Liberal Institute. In 1895, he was appointed assistant to J.A. Lintner, the State Entomologist of New York. Following Lintner's death in 1898, Felt was appointed as State Entomologist and remained in that position until his retirement in 1928. In retirement he worked at Bartlett Tree Research Laboratories in Stamford, Connecticut, where he died from a heart attack on December 14, 1943.

He married Helen Maria Otterson on June 24, 1896, and they had two children.

Felt worked mostly with Nematocera, particularly Cecidomyiidae. However, as State Entomologist for New York, the scope of his work included all insects of economic or medical significance. He wrote Insects Affecting Park and Woodland Trees (New York State Museum Memoir 8, 1905-1906) and Plant Galls and Gall Makers (Ithaca, N.Y., Comstock Pub. Co., 1940), and described over 1,000 species in scientific journals. He described the mosquito genus Culiseta. The holotypes of the Felt-named insect species are in the National Museum of Natural History.

References

External links
PDFs of papers on mosquitoes

1868 births
1943 deaths
American entomologists
Boston University alumni
Cornell University alumni
Dipterists
Massachusetts Agricultural College alumni